York Street is a football stadium in Boston, England.

York Street may also refer to:
 York Street, Albany,  Western Australia
 York Street, Dublin, Ireland
 York Street, Sydney, New South Wales, Australia
 York Street Historic District, in Newport, Kentucky, United States
 York Street Public School in Ottawa, Canada
 York Street Studio, a recording studio in Auckland, New Zealand
 York Street in Toronto, Canada

Railway stations 
 York Street station (IND Sixth Avenue Line), a station of the New York City Subway
 York Street station (Tampa), in Tampa, Florida
 York Street station (New Brunswick), in Fredericton, New Brunswick, Canada
 York Street/Freemason station, a light rail station in Norfolk, Virginia, United States